Inquisitor kurodai, common name Kuroda's turrid, is a species of sea snail, a marine gastropod mollusk in the family Pseudomelatomidae, the turrids and allies.

Description
The length of the shell attains 35 mm.

Distribution
This marine species occurs off Japan and the Philippines.

References

 Habe, T. & S. Kosuge, 1966a, Shells of the world in colour, Vol. I. The tropical Pacific. vii, (2 pp. map], 193 pp., pis. 1-68, supplemental pis. 1-2; Hoikusha, Osaka
 Liu J.Y. [Ruiyu] (ed.). (2008). Checklist of marine biota of China seas. China Science Press. 1267 pp.

External links
 
 Gastropods.com: Inquisitor kurodai

kurodai
Gastropods described in 1966